Knapton is a village and a civil parish in the English county of Norfolk. The Village is located alongside the B1145 a route which runs between King's Lynn and Mundesley. The nearest railway station is at North Walsham for the Bittern Line which runs between Sheringham, Cromer and Norwich. The nearest airport is Norwich International Airport.

History
Knapton is mentioned in the Domesday Book of 1086 where it is listed under the name 'Kanapatone'. The tenant in chief was William de Warenne who was a Norman aristocrat who fought at the Battle of Hastings and became great landowners in England.

Saint Peter and Saint Paul Parish Church
The present church dates from mainly the 14th century. The tower is set into the north west corner of the building. The porch is on the southern elevation. Atop of the church there is a weathervane designed by J.S. Cotman an artist famed as a member of the Norwich school. Inside there is a 13th-century font on three high steps which has a Purbeck marble bowl and a cover over which dates from 1704. The inscription which is in Greek reads "wash my sins and not my face only" The inscription is a palindrome, reading the same backwards as forwards.. At the back of the church behind the font there are some coffin-lids from the earlier church set into the flags of the floor. The most prominent feature of this church is the roof. The roof was given to the church by a John Smithe in 1504. It is of a double hammerbeam construction and still retains its original colour. The beams and spandrels are richly carved with three tiers of angels which have outspread wings. More angels are carved on the kingposts and on the wall plate. In niches below the wall supports there are figures with scrolls, shields, symbols or playing musical instruments.  The church is a Grade I listed building.

Church Gallery

Notable residents
Walter Pardon - carpenter and traditional folk singer

References

External links
Village Website

External links

Villages in Norfolk
Civil parishes in Norfolk
North Norfolk